Stanko Lorger (14 February 1931 – 25 April 2014) was a Yugoslav hurdler who competed in the 1952 Summer Olympics, in the 1956 Summer Olympics, and in the 1960 Summer Olympics.

Bibliography
-Andreou,Evangelos: "The star of champion shone..." Ed. EUARCE 2011 ("Stanko Lorger" p.24) Ευάγγελος Ανδρέου, Το αστέρι του πρωταθλητή άναψε... / ο βαλκανιονίκης του μεσοπολέμου Γιάννης Σκιαδάς, EUARCE 2011  ("Λόργκερ, Στάνκο/Stanko Lorger" σ.24)

References

1931 births
2014 deaths
Slovenian male hurdlers
Slovenian people of German descent
Slovenian male sprinters
Olympic athletes of Yugoslavia
Athletes (track and field) at the 1952 Summer Olympics
Athletes (track and field) at the 1956 Summer Olympics
Athletes (track and field) at the 1960 Summer Olympics
European Athletics Championships medalists
Yugoslav male hurdlers
Yugoslav male sprinters
Universiade medalists in athletics (track and field)
Universiade gold medalists for Yugoslavia
Medalists at the 1959 Summer Universiade